Shamshad Akhtar is a Pakistani development economist, United Nations diplomat and banker who also served as the caretaker Finance Minister of Pakistan. 

Prior to that, she served as the 14th Governor of the State Bank of Pakistan, the first woman to assume this position. She also served as a senior adviser to the then Secretary-General of the United Nations, Ban Ki-moon and as Vice-President of the World Bank.

In December 2013, Akhtar was selected by the UN Secretary-General as Under-Secretary-General and the 10th Chief Secretary of the Monetary and Social Commission for Asia and the Pacific (ESCAP).

Early life and education
Shamshad Akhtar was born in Hyderabad, Sindh, Pakistan.

She moved to the United Kingdom on a Commonwealth Scholarship to study at the University of Sussex, receiving an M.A in development economics in 1977. She moved to the University of the West of Scotland (then Paisley College of Technology) where she was awarded a PhD in Economics in 1980.

Career 

Akhtar started her career in 1980 with the Planning Commission in Islamabad but moved few months later to work with the World Bank's Resident Mission in Pakistan as a country economist. She left in 1986 for a year-long sabbatical to attend John F. Kennedy School of Government at Harvard University as a postdoctoral researcher under the Fulbright Program.

In 2005, she moved back to Pakistan to serve as the 14th Governor of the State Bank of Pakistan, a position she retained until January 2009.

In 2009, Akhtar re-joined the Asian Development Bank as a senior advisor to Haruhiko Kuroda. She moved to Washington, D.C. to be able to work at the World Bank and served as the Vice President, World Bank Middle East and North Africa region. During this period, she spearheaded the bank's response to the Arab Spring political campaign and the Arab regional integration strategy and its implementation. 

In September 2011, she moved to the United Nations to serve as the Assistant Secretary-General for Economic and Social Affairs and Senior Adviser on Economic Development and Finance to the UN Secretary-General Ban Ki-moon.

In December 2013, Akhtar was appointed as the 10th Executive Secretary of UNESCAP in Bangkok.

In 2020, Akhtar was appointed by United Nations Secretary-General António Guterres to serve on the Advisory Committee for the 2021 Food Systems Summit, chaired by Inger Andersen.

Recognition
 On 23 October 2007, Akhtar was conferred Best Central Bank Governor for Asia 2007 by the Euromoney Institutional Investor. 
 On 11 November  2008, Akhtar was named amongst the top ten women leaders in Asia by The Wall Street Journal.

References

External links
Official website of State Bank of Pakistan
Shamshad awarded “Best Central Bank Governor in Asia” prize
Shamshad visits native village for first time

Harvard Kennedy School alumni
Governors of the State Bank of Pakistan
Finance Ministers of Pakistan
Alumni of the University of the West of Scotland
People from Hyderabad District, Pakistan
People from Naushahro Feroze District
Alumni of the University of Sussex
Living people
Muhajir people
University of the Punjab alumni
Quaid-i-Azam University alumni
Under-Secretaries-General of the United Nations
Pakistani expatriates in the United Kingdom
Pakistani expatriates in the United States
Pakistani officials of the United Nations
1954 births
Fulbright alumni